Hishin may refer to:
 Hishin-e Olya
 Hishin-e Sofla